They Might Be Giants In... Holidayland (sometimes referred to simply as Holidayland), was a holiday-themed EP released by American rock band They Might Be Giants in 2001 under Restless Records. The recording consists of: "Santa Claus", a Sonics cover originally released on Emusic.com's TMBG Unlimited service; "Santa's Beard", first released on Lincoln and later Then: The Earlier Years; "Feast of Lights", also from TMBG Unlimited, and appearing on the compilation Festival of Lights 2; "Careless Santa", from Mono Puff's album Unsupervised; and "O Tannenbaum", from 1993's O Tannenbaum EP and, later, TMBG Unlimited.

The EP itself is not a complete collection of holiday songs by the band, leaving out "Christmas Cards" (the original B-side of "O Tannenbaum") and the Dial-A-Song exclusive "We Just Go Nuts At Christmas Time."

Track listing 
"Santa Claus" (Gerry Roslie) – 2:55
"Santa's Beard" – 1:55
"Feast of Lights" – 2:35
"Careless Santa" (featuring Yuval Gabay) (J. Flansburgh) – 2:19
"O Tannenbaum" (trad.) – 2:05

All songs written by They Might Be Giants unless noted.

External links 
They Might Be Giants in Holidayland on This Might Be A Wiki

2001 EPs
They Might Be Giants EPs
2001 Christmas albums
Christmas albums by American artists
Alternative rock Christmas albums